Samuel Washington (Wat) Arnold (September 21, 1879 – December 18, 1961) was a U.S. Representative from Missouri.

Early life and career
Born on September 21, 1879 on a farm near Downing in Schuyler County, Missouri, he was the son of Cumberland Wilson Arnold and Mary Elizabeth (Hill) Arnold. He attended the Coffey, Missouri rural school, then advanced to the North Missouri Normal School (now known as Truman State University) in Kirksville, Missouri, graduating in 1902. After a brief career as a teacher and superintendent in several rural northeast Missouri schools, Mr. Arnold moved to St. Louis, Missouri in 1904 for employment with the internal revenue office. It was also in 1904, on Christmas Eve, that Sam married his wife Myra Gertrude Mills. The following year, 1905, the Arnolds moved to Atlanta, Missouri where he began a fifty-plus year career as a lumberman. Seeking a larger customer base Arnold moved his family to Kirksville in 1908 and established the Arnold Lumber Company. It continued to be a fixture of the Kirksville business community for the next seventy-five years.

Politics
Mr. Arnold was elected as a Republican to the Seventy-eighth, Seventy-ninth, and Eightieth Congresses (January 3, 1943 – January 3, 1949). He was an unsuccessful candidate for reelection in 1948 to the Eighty-first Congress, for election in 1950 to the Eighty-second Congress, and in 1952 to the Eighty-third Congress. Following the defeats he retired from political life. Mr. Arnold was also a founding partner of North Missouri Broadcasting Company, which built and operated radio stations KIRX in Kirksville, Missouri, and KTTN in Trenton, Missouri. Congressman Arnold died in Kirksville, Missouri, December 18, 1961, and was interred in that city's Maple Hills Cemetery.

References
 A Book of Adair County History, Published by the Kirksville-Adair County Bicentennia Committee, 1976.

1879 births
1961 deaths
People from Schuyler County, Missouri
People from Kirksville, Missouri
Truman State University alumni
Republican Party members of the United States House of Representatives from Missouri
People from Macon County, Missouri